Egor Aleksandrovich Koreshkov (born March 31, 1986) is a Russian actor. He appeared in over 50 films.

Biography
Egor was born on March 31, 1986 into a family of musicians. He studied at the directing department of the Russian Institute of Theatre Arts. Since 2011 he has been working at the Theatre of Nations.

Selected filmography

References

External links 
 Egor Koreshkov on KinoPoisk
 

1986 births
Living people
Male actors from Moscow
Russian male film actors
Russian male television actors
Russian male stage actors
21st-century Russian male actors